Reima Juhani Karppinen (born 27 January 1958) is a retired Finnish rower who specialized in the double sculls. In this event, he won a silver medal at the 1981 World Rowing Championships, together with his legendary brother Pertti. He competed at the 1984, 1988 and 1992 Summer Olympics, with other partners, and finished in 8th, 12th and 13th place, respectively.

References

1958 births
Living people
Finnish male rowers
Olympic rowers of Finland
Rowers at the 1984 Summer Olympics
Rowers at the 1988 Summer Olympics
Rowers at the 1992 Summer Olympics
World Rowing Championships medalists for Finland
People from Vehmaa
Sportspeople from Southwest Finland